The Illinois Solidarity Party was an American political party in the state of Illinois.  It was named after Lech Wałęsa's Solidarity movement in Poland, which was then widely admired in Illinois, which has a very large Polish-American population, especially around Chicago.

The party was founded in 1986 by Senator Adlai Stevenson III in reaction to the Democratic Party's nomination of two followers of Lyndon LaRouche in the race for high state offices: Mark Fairchild, who was running for Lieutenant Governor, and Janice Hart, who was running for Illinois Secretary of State.  Stevenson, a Democratic candidate for Illinois Governor, did not want to run alongside anybody associated with LaRouche's organization.

There are a number of explanations as to how LaRouche's followers became nominees. Some believe that it simply boiled down to the names of the LaRouche candidates, which sounded less "ethnic" than those of their opponents, George E. Sangmeister and Aurelia Pucinski. Hart's victory over Pucinski was likely helped by a voter reaction to Pucinski, whose father, Roman Pucinski, was a prominent opponent of Chicago Mayor Harold Washington.

Many criticized the Democrats for their failure to inform voters exactly who the candidates were, which allowed campaigning efforts in rural areas to be very effective. "LaRouche Democrats" claimed that the Democratic Party, especially Chairman Charles Manatt, was under the influence of the Soviet leader Mikhail Gorbachev. LaRouche maintained that the population voted for his followers to take the party back from elitist bankers.

In any case, most analysts, including Stevenson himself, agreed that the whole ordeal confused voters and helped the Republican Party's James R. Thompson win the election.

The "Solidarity Democrats" and the LaRouche supporters blamed one another for the subsequent years of Republican control in Illinois state government. Stevenson left politics and went on to become an investment banker.

The Solidarity Party continued to exist, completely unaffiliated with Stevenson, after the 1986 incident. In the 1987 Chicago mayoral election, Edward Vrdolyak ran for Mayor of Chicago on the Illinois Solidarity Party ticket, which provided the major opposition to incumbent Harold Washington, Chicago's first African-American mayor, losing to Washington by a final tally of 53%–43%.

Its continued existence afterward made it an easy target for other small political parties to "take over" whenever necessary. One such group was the New Alliance Party (NAP), which was largely unknown in Illinois but still managed to run some of its candidates for local offices. The NAP founder Lenora Fulani campaigned as a Solidarity Party presidential candidate in 1988 and 1992.

References 
 THE 1986 LAROUCHE ELECTION DEBACLE IN ILLINOIS
 SOME INDICATIONS THAT FOREIGN SOUNDING NAMES MATTER
 Etext of LaRouche Book: The Ugly Truth About the ADL
 LaRouchies pose serious threat to uninformed voters
 Brooks’ fraudulent arguments aren’t worth ignoring anymore
 Primary elections: GOP contest for governor, Democrat fights for two lesser offices
CHICAGO RE-ELECTS WASHINGTON AS MAYOR - The New York Times

1986 establishments in Illinois
Factions in the Democratic Party (United States)
Political parties established in 1986
Political parties in Illinois
Regional and state political parties in the United States